Chapters and alumni associations for Alpha Phi Omega of the Philippines. Chapters exist at colleges and universities. Alumni associations exist for those who joined at chapters and are no longer at colleges and university.

Regions
The eleven (11) Administrative Regions for Alpha Phi Omega of the Philippines, wfeith their corresponding Sections, as are follows:

 National Capital Administrative Region (NCAR)
 Northern Luzon Administrative Region (NLAR)
 Southern Tagalog Administrative Region (STAR)
 Bicol Administrative Region (BAR)
 Northwestern Visayas Administrative Region (NVAR  NWVAR)
 Eastern Visayas Administrative Region (EVAR)
 Northwestern Mindanao Administrative Region (NMAR a.k.a. NWMAR)
 Southeastern Mindanao Administrative Region (SMAR a.k.a. SEMAR)
 Administrative Region of North America (ARNA)
 Administrative Region of Asia (ARA)
 Administrative  Region of the Pacific (ARP)
 Administrative Region of Middle East (ARME)
 Administrative Region of Europe (ARE)

Chapters and Alumni Associations exist in the first eight regions, Alumni Associations only in the last five.

Alpha Phi Omega (Philippines) Chapters

Alumni Associations

External links
 Alpha Phi Omega of the Philippines chapter wikis, currently focused on Zamboanga chapters.
 Alpha Phi Omega, Philippines official website

References

Philippine chapters and alumni associations
Alpha Phi Omega (Philippines)